Monitor is a hamlet in east-central Alberta, Canada within Special Area No. 4.

History 
Previously an incorporated municipality, Monitor dissolved from village status on January 1, 1946, to become part of Improvement District No. 331.

Demographics 
Monitor recorded a population of 60 in the 1991 Census of Population conducted by Statistics Canada.

See also 
List of communities in Alberta
List of former urban municipalities in Alberta
List of hamlets in Alberta

References 

Hamlets in Alberta
Former villages in Alberta
Special Area No. 4